Eversole may refer to:

Eversole, Kentucky
 John T. Eversole (1915-1942), U.S. Navy officer
 Joseph C. Eversole, American politician
 USS Eversole (DE-404)
 USS Eversole (DD-789)
 Charles Eversole House, listed on the NRHP in Hunterdon County, New Jersey

See also

 Ebersole